Lycia ypsilon, the woolly gray, is a species of geometrid moth in the family Geometridae. It is found in North America.

The MONA or Hodges number for Lycia ypsilon is 6652.

Subspecies
These two subspecies belong to the species Lycia ypsilon:
 Lycia ypsilon carlotta Hulst, 1896
 Lycia ypsilon ypsilon

References

Further reading

External links

 

Bistonini
Articles created by Qbugbot
Moths described in 1885